"Suck You Dry" is a song by the American grunge band Mudhoney and the first single from their 1992 studio album Piece of Cake.

Track listing

Plays same both sides.

Charts

References 

Mudhoney songs
1992 singles
1992 songs
Reprise Records singles